Karin Elisabet Lissel (born 25 March 1987) is a Swedish football defender who most recently played for Tyresö FF of the Damallsvenskan. She previously represented Hammarby IF DFF.

Tyresö won the Damallsvenskan title for the first time in the 2012 season as Lissel collected her first league winner's medal. She was captain of the team in the absence of the injured Johanna Frisk. With competition for places increasingly fierce, Lissel's playing time reduced during 2013 and she was linked with a mid-season transfer to Kvarnsvedens IK.

Lissel has made three appearances for the senior Sweden women's national football team. After making her debut against China in July 2009, she was drafted into the UEFA Women's Euro 2009 squad as a late replacement for the injured Linda Sembrant.

References

External links
 Swedish FA player profile 
 Tyresö FF player profile 

1987 births
Living people
Swedish women's footballers
Sweden women's international footballers
Tyresö FF players
Damallsvenskan players
Women's association football defenders
People from Borlänge Municipality
Sportspeople from Dalarna County